Zhalti Bryag is a village in Stambolovo Municipality in Haskovo Province in southern Bulgaria.

References

Villages in Stambolovo Municipality